Disneynature is an independent film studio that specializes in the production of nature documentary films for Walt Disney Studios, a division of Disney Entertainment, which is owned by The Walt Disney Company. The production company was founded on April 21, 2008, and is headquartered in Paris, France.

The company's nature films are consistently budgeted between $5 million to $10 million, with their distribution and marketing handled by Walt Disney Studios Motion Pictures. The label's event films are released on Earth Day and have a conservation campaign based on the feature of the film with an appropriate conservation charity receiving donations based on tickets sold, at a pace of one per year. The eight Disneynature theatrical films have a gross of $151.6 million at the box office, at an average of $19 million, with Earth the top earner at $32 million.

Background
Disney had a background in making nature films prior to the creation of Disneynature; Bambi (1942) featured forest life and was a hit. From 1948 through 1960, the company produced the True-Life Adventures series, which won several Academy Awards. Outside of film work, Disney parks were involved. Disneyland in 1955 opened the Jungle Cruise ride. Walt Disney World includes Disney's Animal Kingdom, which is a theme park crossed with a zoo. Animal Kingdom has contributed to conservation causes by nursing endangered sea turtles back to health, returning white rhinos to Africa and conducting a census of cotton-top tamarins, a monkey species native to Colombia. In addition, since its creation in 1995, the Disney Wildlife Conservation Fund has given over $11 million to 650 conservation projects in 110 countries.

After a long absence from nature documentaries, Disney decided to get back into the market after the French release of March of the Penguins. The film was given U.S. distribution through Warner Independent Pictures in 2005. Made on an $8 million budget, it grossed almost 10 times its budget at the U.S. box office and won the Academy Award for Best Documentary Feature in 2006. Jean-Francois Camilleri, head of Buena Vista International France at the time, had the company acquire the film for the French market. Buena Vista International France also managed to obtain a 20% ownership stake in the French version of the film. However, Buena Vista Pictures Distribution's bid to distribute the film in the U.S. ultimately failed. Disney CEO Bob Iger, in consideration of Disney's past efforts, felt that Penguins "should have been a Disney film worldwide". This was the impetus behind the creation of Disneynature. The film's 2007 follow-up was Arctic Tale, which only took in $1.8 million worldwide. Paul Baribault, Vice President of Disney Studios Marketing, led the US efforts for Disneynature from 2008 forward, overseeing all marketing, production, brand development, and conservation programatic efforts for the label. He was eventually named General Manager of Disneynature.

History
Disneynature was announced on April 21, 2008, a day before Earth Day, with a starting slate of seven films. Camilleri was set to head the new division. A multi-film production agreement was made with Alastair Fothergill, BBC's Planet Earth series producer, for three scheduled films: Earth (2009), African Cats (2011) and Chimpanzee (2012). The other announced slate films and their release years were: The Crimson Wing: Mystery of the Flamingos (2008), Oceans (2010), Orangutans: One Minute to Midnight (2010) and Wings of Life (2011). Original announced plans had the division releasing two films per year, which was curtailed by April 2009 due to a nature film's long period needed to film wildlife. No decision was made at that time as to whether or not the studio would donate the films' proceeds to conservation causes.

The Crimson Wing: Mystery of the Flamingos was the first film produced for Disneynature. The first film released domestically under the new label was Earth, opening on April 22, 2009, in the US. In 2012, a Disneynature TV cable channel was launched in France. It is currently carried by France Telecom.

Animal Planet pick up for a two-year period three Disneynature films, Oceans, African Cats, and The Crimson Wing: Mystery of the Flamingos, in April 2012 from Disney-ABC Domestic Television. In April 2014, Jane Goodall was named Disneynature ambassador.

Disneynature has recently expanded to China with the production of Born in China. The production was made possible due to an expansion of Disney's relationship with Shanghai Media Group starting in 2014. Following Born in China, Ghost of the Mountains and Expedition China were released to Netflix to reflect the incredible journeys involved in creating these films. In 2016, the company released its first compilation film, Growing Up Wild, direct-to-video (Blu-ray and DVD) and video on demand.

Paul Baribault, Vice President of Studio Marketing and Disneynature, was appointed General Manager of Disneynature officially in 2018, after having been operating in the capacity for several years. Camilleri resigned his posts with Disney in March 2019. Helene Etzi was appointed to take over his responsibility as head of Disney's French operations. The unit's first streaming films for Disney+ was Dolphin Reef and Elephant.

Filmography

Notes

References

External links
 

2008 establishments in France
Companies based in Paris
Companies based in Burbank, California
Disney production studios
Film production companies of the United States
Film production companies of France
Mass media companies established in 2008
Walt Disney Studios (division)
The Walt Disney Company subsidiaries